In computer vision, triangulation refers to the process of determining a point in 3D space given its projections onto two, or more, images.  In order to solve this problem it is necessary to know the parameters of the camera projection function from 3D to 2D for the cameras involved, in the simplest case represented by the camera matrices.  Triangulation is sometimes also referred to as reconstruction or intersection.

The triangulation problem is in principle trivial. Since each point in an image corresponds to a line in 3D space, all points on the line in 3D are projected to the point in the image.  If a pair of corresponding points in two, or more images, can be found it must be the case that they are the projection of a common 3D point x.  The set of lines generated by the image points must intersect at x  (3D point) and the algebraic formulation of the coordinates of x (3D point) can be computed in a variety of ways, as is presented below.

In practice, however, the coordinates of image points cannot be measured with arbitrary accuracy.  Instead, various types of noise, such as geometric noise from lens distortion or interest point detection error, lead to inaccuracies in the measured image coordinates.  As a consequence, the lines generated by the corresponding image points do not always intersect in 3D space.  The problem, then, is to find a 3D point which optimally fits the measured image points.  In the literature there are multiple proposals for how to define optimality and how to find the optimal 3D point.  Since they are based on different optimality criteria, the various methods produce different estimates of the 3D point x when noise is involved.

Introduction 

In the following, it is assumed that triangulation is made on corresponding image points from two views generated by pinhole cameras.  Generalization from these assumptions are discussed here.

The image to the left illustrates the epipolar geometry of a pair of stereo cameras of pinhole model. Using basic linear algebra that intersection point can be determined in a straightforward way.

The image to the right shows the real case.  The position of the image points  and  cannot be measured exactly.  The reason is a combination of factors such as 

 Geometric distortion, for example lens distortion, which means that the 3D to 2D mapping of the camera deviates from the pinhole camera model.  To some extent these errors can be compensated for, leaving a residual geometric error.
 A single ray of light from x (3D point) is dispersed in the lens system of the cameras according to a point spread function.  The recovery of the corresponding image point from measurements of the dispersed intensity function in the images gives errors.
 In a digital camera, the image intensity function is only measured in discrete sensor elements.  Inexact interpolation of the discrete intensity function have to be used to recover the true one.
 The image points y1' and y2' used for triangulation are often found using various types of feature extractors, for example of corners or interest points in general.  There is an inherent localization error for any type of feature extraction based on neighborhood operations.

However, their projection lines (blue) do not have to intersect in 3D space or come close to x. In fact, these lines intersect if and only if  and  satisfy the epipolar constraint defined by the fundamental matrix.

This observation leads to the problem which is solved in triangulation. The answer is often found by defining an error measure which depends on xest and then minimizing this error. In the following sections, some of the various methods for computing xest presented in the literature are briefly described.

It is what happens when the constraint is not satisfied which differs between the methods.

Properties 

A triangulation method can be described in terms of a function  such that

The  sign implies that  is only required to produce a vector which is equal to x up to a multiplication by a non-zero scalar since homogeneous vectors are involved.

Before looking at the specific methods, that is, specific functions , there are some general concepts related to the methods that need to be explained.  Which triangulation method is chosen for a particular problem depends to some extent on these characteristics.

Singularities 

A point in this subset is then a singularity of the triangulation method. The reason for the failure can be that some equation system to be solved is under-determined or that the projective representation of xest becomes the zero vector for the singular points.

Invariance 

In some applications, it is desirable that the triangulation is independent of the coordinate system used to represent 3D points; if the triangulation problem is formulated in one coordinate system and then transformed into another the resulting estimate xest should transform in the same way.  This property is commonly referred to as invariance.  Not every triangulation method assures invariance, at least not for general types of coordinate transformations.

For a homogeneous representation of 3D coordinates, the most general transformation is a projective transformation, represented by a  matrix .  If the homogeneous coordinates are transformed according to

then the camera matrices must transform as (Ck)

to produce the same homogeneous image coordinates (yk)

If the triangulation function  is invariant to  then the following relation must be valid

from which follows that

   for all 

For each triangulation method, it can be determined if this last relation is valid.  If it is, it may be satisfied only for a subset of the projective transformations, for example, rigid or affine transformations.

Computational complexity 

The function  is only an abstract representation of a computation which, in practice, may be relatively complex. This means that both the computation time and the complexity of the operations involved may vary between the different methods.

Methods

Mid-point method 

Let  be a distance function between a (3D line) L and a x (3D point) such that 
The midpoint method finds the point xest which minimizes

It turns out that xest lies exactly at the middle of the shortest line segment which joins the two projection lines.

Direct linear transformation

Via the essential matrix 

If the essential matrix is known and the corresponding rotation and translation transformations have been determined, this algorithm (described in Longuet-Higgins' paper) provides a solution.

Let  denote row k of the rotation matrix :

Combining the above relations between 3D coordinates in the two coordinate systems and the mapping between 3D and 2D points described earlier gives

or

Once  is determined, the other two coordinates can be computed as

The above derivation is not unique.

There are also other types of extensions of the above computations which are possible.  They started with an expression of the primed image coordinates and derived 3D coordinates in the unprimed system.  It is also possible to start with unprimed image coordinates and obtain primed 3D coordinates, which finally can be transformed into unprimed 3D coordinates.  Again, in the ideal case the result should be equal to the above expressions, but in practice they may deviate.

A final remark relates to the fact that if the essential matrix is determined from corresponding image coordinate, which often is the case when 3D points are determined in this way, the translation vector  is known only up to an unknown positive scaling. As a consequence, the reconstructed 3D points, too, are undetermined with respect to a positive scaling.

See also 
Bundle adjustment
Line–line intersection

References

External links 
Two view and multi-view triangulation in Matlab

Geometry in computer vision
Stereophotogrammetry